The Modruš-Rijeka County was a historic administrative subdivision (županija) of the Kingdom of Croatia-Slavonia. Croatia-Slavonia was an autonomous kingdom within the Lands of the Crown of Saint Stephen (Transleithania), the Hungarian part of the dual Austro-Hungarian Empire. Its territory is now in western Croatia. Modruš is a small town near Ogulin; Rijeka is a large city on the Adriatic coast. However, Rijeka (then officially Fiume) was not part of the Modruš-Rijeka County, but under the direct administration of Hungary. The capital of the county was Ogulin.

Geography
The Modruš-Rijeka County shared borders with the Austrian lands Istria, Carniola and Bosnia-Herzegovina and the counties of Zagreb and Lika-Krbava (both in Croatia-Slavonia). The county had a strip of Adriatic Sea coast. Its area was 4879 km2 around 1910.

History

The territory of the county was part of the Kingdom of Croatia when it entered a personal union with the Kingdom of Hungary in 1102, and with it became part of the Habsburg monarchy in 1526. The county was created in the late 18th century. In 1920, by the Treaty of Trianon the county became part of the newly formed Kingdom of Serbs, Croats, and Slovenes (later renamed to Yugoslavia). Since 1991, when Croatia became independent from Yugoslavia, the county has been part of Croatia.

Demographics
In 1900, the county had a population of 228,452 people and was composed of the following linguistic communities:

Total:

 Croatian: 150,982 (66.1%)
 Serbian: 73,604 (32.2%)
 Hungarian: 601 (0.3%)
 German: 512 (0.2%)
 Slovak: 58 (0.0%)
 Ruthenian: 4 (0.0%)
 Romanian: 3 (0.0%)
 Other or unknown: 2,688 (1.2%)

According to the census of 1900, the county was composed of the following religious communities:

Total:

 Roman Catholic: 154,276 (67.5%)
 Greek Orthodox: 73,632 (32.2%)
 Jewish: 335 (0.2%)
 Lutheran: 128 (0.1%)
 Calvinist: 66 (0.0%)
 Greek Catholic: 8 (0.0%)
 Unitarian: 0 (0.0%)
 Other or unknown: 7 (0.0%)

In 1910, the county had a population of 231,654 people and was composed of the following linguistic communities:

Total:

 Croatian: 152,210 (65.7%) 
 Serbian: 74,894 (32.3%)
 Hungarian: 899 (0.4%)
 German: 592 (0.3%) 
 Slovak: 64 (0.0%)
 Romanian: 6 (0.0%)
 Ruthenian: 4 (0.0%)
 Other or unknown: 2,985 (1.3%)

According to the census of 1910, the county was composed of the following religious communities:

Total:

 Roman Catholic: 156,060 (67.4%)
 Greek Orthodox: 74,941 (32.4%)
 Jewish: 382 (0.2%)
 Lutheran: 117 (0.1%)
 Calvinist: 101 (0.0%)
 Greek Catholic: 39 (0.0%)
 Unitarian: 4 (0.0%)
 Other or unknown: 10 (0.0%)

Subdivisions
In the early 20th century, the subdivisions of Modruš-Rijeka county were:

See also

Karlovac and Primorje-Gorski Kotar counties of Croatia

References

 
1920 disestablishments
Former counties of Croatia
Counties in the Kingdom of Hungary
States and territories established in the 12th century